A botánica is a Latin-American-Caribbean style shop specializing in articles of folk magic and similar merchandise.

Botanica may also refer to:

Botanica (band), an American music rock group
Botanica (Transformers), a character from Beast Machines
Botanica (series), a series of puzzle adventure games
Sectorul Botanica, a sector of Chișinău, Moldova